Plagiaulax is a genus of mammal from the Lower Cretaceous of Europe. It was a member of the also extinct order Multituberculata, and shared the world with dinosaurs. It is of the suborder "Plagiaulacida" and family Plagiaulacidae. The genus was named by Hugh Falconer in 1857, and was the first described multituberculate species.
 
Fossil remains of the species Plagiaulax becklesii are known from the Lulworth Formation of Durlston Bay in Dorset, England. They include at least one partial lower jaw with teeth, though there may well be further specimens. Some material has been reported from Galve, Spain.

Another possible species, P. dawsoni, was provisionally named by Woodward in 1891. This came from the county of Sussex, which is further east along the English coast. It was subsequently damaged and there seems not to have been a scientific description. Its discoverer, Charles Dawson has been implicated in the Piltdown hoax and Pevensey tiles hoax.

References 

 Kielan-Jaworowska Z. and Hurum J.H. (2001), "Phylogeny and Systematics of multituberculate mammals." Paleontology 44, p. 389-429.

Multituberculates
Cretaceous mammals
Prehistoric mammals of Europe
Prehistoric mammal genera